Grabian is a village and a former municipality in the Fier County, western Albania. At the 2015 local government reform it became a subdivision of the municipality Divjakë. The population at the 2011 census was 3,638.

References

Former municipalities in Fier County
Administrative units of Divjakë
Villages in Fier County